Khamees is a surname. Notable people with the surname include:

Adnan Khamees Al-Talyani (born 1964), retired footballer from the United Arab Emirates
Bader Al-Khamees (born 1984), Saudi Arabian football player
Fahad Khamees (born 1962), Emirati footballer
Mahmoud Khamees (born 1987), Emirati footballer
Mohammad Khamees (born 1981), Jordanian footballer
Nasir Khamees (born 1965), Emirati footballer
Yousef Khamees (footballer, born 1961), Saudi football forward
Yousef Khamees (footballer, born 1990), Saudi Arabian footballer
Khamees Saad Mubarak, UAE football forward